Club Atlético Independiente's 2013–14 season is the first season in the Primera B Nacional, following relegation from the Primera División in 2013. Independiente this season going to play in the Primera B Nacional and the Copa Argentina.

Squad

Current squad

Last updated on 9 April 2014

Players out on loan

Transfers

Winter transfers

Summer transfers

Current coaching staff

{|class="wikitable"
|+
! style="background-color:white; color:black;" scope="col"|Position
! style="background-color:white; color:black;" scope="col"|Staff
|-

Friendlies

Competitions

Primera B Nacional

Tie-Break Playoff match

Season review

League table

Results summary 

Game 43, against Huracán, was neutral, but Independiente was "home" by a draw.

Results by round

Copa Argentina

Squad statistics

Updated on 9 May 2014

Goals

Disciplinary record

Penalties

Overall
{| class="wikitable" style="text-align: center"
|-
!
!Total
!Home
!Away
!Naturel
|-
|align=left| Games played          || 44 || 21 || 21 || 2
|-
|align=left| Games won             || 19 || 10 || 7 || 2
|-
|align=left| Games drawn           || 16 || 8 || 8 || -
|-
|align=left| Games lost            || 9 || 3 || 6 || -
|-
|align=left| Biggest win           || 3 – 0 vs Ferro Carril Oeste 3-0 vs Talleres  ||
|-
|align=left| Biggest loss          || 1–3 vs Atlético Tucumán  || 1-3 vs Atlético Tucumán ||  0–2 vs Sarmiento 1-3 vs Crucero del Norte || -
|-
|align=left| Biggest win (League)  || 3 – 0 vs Ferro Carril Oeste || 3-0 vs Talleres || -
|-
|align=left| Biggest win (Cup)    || 4-2 vs Santamarina ||  - || - || 4-2 vs Santamarina
|-
|align=left| Biggest loss (League)        || 1–3 vs Atlético Tucumán  || 1-3 vs Atlético Tucumán ||   0–2 vs Sarmiento 1-3 vs Crucero del Norte || -
|-
|align=left| Biggest loss (Cup)    || -  || - || - || -
|-
|align=left| Clean sheets          || 19 || 9 || 9 || 1
|-
|align=left| Goals scored          || 55 || 30 || 19 || 6
|-
|align=left| Goals conceded        || 39 || 17 || 20 || 2
|-
|align=left| Goal difference       || +16 || +13 || -1 || +4
|-
|-
|-
|align=left| Yellow cards         || 103 || 47 || 53 || 3
|-
|align=left| Red cards            || 8 || 3 || 5 || -
|-
|align=left| Most appearances     || align=left| Daniel Montenegro (42) || colspan=3|– 
|-
|align=left| Most minutes played  || align=left| Daniel Montenegro (3,590) || colspan=3|–
|-
|align=left| Most goals           || align=left| Daniel Montenegro (10) || colspan=3|–
|-
|align=left| Winning rate         || % || % || % || %
|-

References

External links
 Club Atlético Independiente official web site 

Ind
Club Atlético Independiente seasons
Argentine football clubs 2015 season